Fulco Luigi Ruffo-Scilla (6 April 1840 – 29 May 1895) was a Cardinal of the Catholic Church. He was elevated in 1891.

Early life
Ruffo-Scilla was born in Palermo, Sicily. He was the son of Fulco Ruffo, 9th Prince of Scilla, and Eleonora Galletti.

His initial studies began with the Barnabites at the Colegio de Pontecorvo from 1850 to 1856. He was later educated at the Roman Seminary where he received a licentiate in theology on 3 September 1860. He was ordained a priest on 20 September 1892 in Rome. He continued his studies, receiving a licentiate in utroque iure (both civil and canon law) on 15 July 1864. He was appointed a Domestic prelate of His Holiness on 13 March 1868 by Pope Pius IX. He was advanced to the level of Protonotary apostolic ad instar participantium on 26 March 1873.

Episcopate
He was appointed as archbishop of Chieti-Vasto on 28 December 1877; on that same day he was granted the pallium. He was named an Assistant at the Pontifical Throne, on 21 June 1881. He was transferred to the titular see of Petra and appointed nuncio to the Kingdom of Bavaria on 23 May 1887. He was later appointed as Master of the Pontifical House and prefect of the Apostolic Palace on 20 March 1889.

Cardinalate 
He was created and proclaimed Cardinal-Priest of S. Maria in Traspontina in the consistory of 14 December 1891 by Pope Leo XIII. He was appointed Camerlengo of the Sacred College of Cardinals, succeeding Mariano Rampolla del Tindaro on 18 May 1894, holding the post until 18 March 1895. He died at the age of 55 on 29 May 1895.

References

1840 births
1895 deaths
19th-century Italian cardinals
Cardinals created by Pope Leo XIII
Apostolic Nuncios to Bavaria
Clergy from Palermo